"Uptown Girl" is a song written and performed by the American musician Billy Joel. The lyrics describe a working-class "downtown man" attempting to woo a wealthy "uptown girl". It was released on September 29, 1983, on his ninth studio album, An Innocent Man (1983).
The 12" EP has the tracks "My Life", "Just the Way You Are" and "It's Still Rock and Roll to Me" (catalogue number TA3775), whereas some 7" single versions featured "Careless Talk" as a B-side. 

"Uptown Girl" peaked at number three on the Billboard Hot 100 for five consecutive weeks from November 12 to December 10, 1983. It also reached number one in the United Kingdom for five weeks, his only number-one hit in the country. It was the second biggest-selling single of 1983 in the United Kingdom behind only Culture Club's "Karma Chameleon", which Joel had knocked off the number-one position on November 1, 1983. The song was the 19th biggest-selling single of the 1980s in the United Kingdom, selling 975,000 copies. It has sold over 1.06 million copies as of 2017.

Inspiration 
According to an interview with Howard Stern, Joel had originally titled the song "Uptown Girls", and it was conceived on an occasion when he was surrounded by Christie Brinkley, Whitney Houston, and his then-girlfriend Elle Macpherson. According to numerous interviews with Joel, the song was initially written about his relationship with Macpherson, but it ended up also becoming about his soon-to-be wife, Brinkley, both women being two of the most famous supermodels of the 1980s. Joel said that the song was inspired by the music of Frankie Valli and the Four Seasons.

Reception
Cash Box said that "sounding uncannily like Frankie Valli, Joel plays out the city uptown-downtown caste system, longing for a seemingly unavailable 'white-bread' lovely."

Music video 
The video depicts Joel and his backup singers working as auto mechanics. Brinkley arrives in a chauffeured Rolls-Royce as Joel and the mechanics dance with her. A poster of Brinkley can be seen in the garage as well as on a billboard above the garage advertising "Uptown Cosmetics". At the end of the video Joel and Brinkley ride off on a motorcycle.

Charts and certifications

Weekly charts

Year-end charts

Certifications

Personnel 
 Billy Joel – Baldwin SF-10 acoustic piano, lead and backing vocals
 David Brown – lead electric guitar
 Russell Javors – rhythm electric guitar
 Doug Stegmeyer – bass guitar
 Liberty DeVitto – drums
 Mark Rivera – percussion, backing vocals

Additional personnel
 Mike Alexander – backing vocals 
 Tom Bahler – backing vocals
 Rory Dodd – backing vocals
 Frank Floyd – backing vocals
 Lani Groves – backing vocals
 Ullanda McCullough – backing vocals
 Ron Taylor – backing vocals
 Terry Textor – backing vocals
 Eric Troyer – backing vocals

Legacy and impact 
Olivia Rodrigo mentioned the song and Joel in her hit single "Deja Vu", which became a top 3 U.S. hit. Rodrigo made a surprise appearance at Joel's Madison Square Garden performance on August 24, 2022, singing "Deja Vu" with Joel on piano and "Uptown Girl" as a duet with Joel.

Westlife version 

Irish boy band Westlife covered the song for their third studio album, World of Our Own. It was released on March 5, 2001 as the lead single from the album and the 2001 Comic Relief charity single. The song was also released as the fifth single for the European Special Edition and Asian Deluxe Edition Bonus Disc of the group's second album, Coast to Coast (2000). The Westlife version is slightly shorter than the Billy Joel version because one of the verses was not repeated. The music video was a parody of the Billy Joel one, with the members of Westlife playing workers in a burger bar, Robert Bathurst, Crispin Bonham-Carter, Ioan Gruffudd, Tim McInnerny and James Wilby play the snobby uptown customers and Claudia Schiffer is in the Christie Brinkley role.

"Uptown Girl" reached number one in Ireland, Mexico and the United Kingdom. It became the biggest selling single of 2001 and the tenth best-selling single of all-time in Ireland. In the United Kingdom, it was the sixth best selling single of 2001 and the 24th best-selling single of the decade in the UK charts, with sales of 756,215 copies. It became the band's biggest selling single (paid-for and combined sales categories) in the UK and also achieved the highest first week sales (292,318 copies) of any of their singles. It has since been certified platinum by the British Phonographic Industry for shipments of 600,000 copies. By March 2017, the song had sold almost 800,000 copies in the country from physical and digital copies which make up 81% of the total units. As of January 2019, it has 920,000 total sales. It is also their second most streamed song in the United Kingdom of all-time. In 30 November 2021, it has 1.1 million total sales with 67% of it or 748,000 were physical sales. This makes the single as part of the list of million-selling singles in the United Kingdom and the first one for the group.

In Mexico, the song was the fourth best-selling single of 2001.

Track listing 
 United Kingdom
 CD1
 "Uptown Girl" (Radio Edit) – 3:06
 "Angel's Wings" (2001 Remix) – 4:14
 "Uptown Girl" (Video) – 3:14

 CD2
 "Uptown Girl" (Radio Edit) – 3:06
 "Uptown Girl" (Extended Version) – 5:02
 "Behind the Scenes Footage & Band Messages"

 VHS
 "Uptown Girl" (The Video) – 3:14
 "The Making of Uptown Girl" (Mini-Documentary)
 "The Bits That Didn't Quite Go to Plan ..."

 DVD
 "Uptown Girl" (The Video) – 3:14
 "The Making of Uptown Girl" (Mini-Documentary)
 "The Bits That Didn't Quite Go to Plan ..."
 "Comic Relief Weblink"
 "Photo Gallery"

 Japan
 "Uptown Girl" (Radio Edit) – 3:06
 "Uptown Girl" (Extended Version) – 5:02
 "Angel's Wings" (Original Version) – 4:02
 "Close Your Eyes" – 4:32
 "Uptown Girl" (Video) – 3:14
 "Behind the Scenes Footage & Band Messages"

Charts and certifications

Weekly charts 
 Video album 

 Single

Year-end charts

Decade-end charts

Certifications and sales

References

External links 
 

1983 songs
1983 singles
1996 singles
2001 singles
Dance-pop songs
Westlife songs
Billy Joel songs
Songs written by Billy Joel
Comic Relief singles
Irish Singles Chart number-one singles
Number-one singles in Australia
Number-one singles in New Zealand
Number-one singles in Scotland
UK Singles Chart number-one singles
Song recordings produced by Phil Ramone
Song recordings produced by Steve Mac
Columbia Records singles
Sony BMG singles
Sony Music singles
RCA Records singles
Music videos directed by Stuart Gosling